Jewett is an unincorporated community located in the town of Erin Prairie, St. Croix County, Wisconsin, United States. The community was named for Samuel A. Jewett, a Maine native who operated saw mills on the Chippewa and St. Croix rivers beginning in 1850.

References

Unincorporated communities in St. Croix County, Wisconsin
Unincorporated communities in Wisconsin